The Ivy House is a Grade II listed public house at 40 Stuart Road, Nunhead, London.

It was designed by the architect A. E. Sewell in the 1930s for Truman's Brewery.

It was originally known as the Newlands Tavern, and has many original features including a curved bar and timber panelled walls. It was one of the major pub music venues in South London during the mid-1970s pub rock boom, with acts including Ian Dury, Elvis Costello, Joe Strummer and Dr. Feelgood. The pub was later renamed the Stuart Arms, before becoming The Ivy House. It is listed by Southwark London Borough Council as an asset of community value.

The Ivy House has been used as a set for many films including the 2015 Kray Brothers biopic Legend.

In recent years the Ivy House has once again emerged as a live music venue, with notable acts such as Goat Girl, caroline, Lynks, Kiran Leonard, and Prima Queen taking to the stage.

References

Grade II listed pubs in London
Nunhead
Assets of community value
A. E. Sewell buildings